Marvin Joey Iosefa (born June 19, 1991) is a former American football fullback. He played college football at Hawaii.

Iosefa was drafted by the Tampa Bay Buccaneers of the National Football League in the seventh round of the 2015 NFL Draft. He has also played for the New England Patriots.

Born on American Samoa, Iosefa is a 2009 graduate of Faga'itua High School.

Professional career

American football

Tampa Bay Buccaneers
In the 2015 NFL draft, Iosefa was drafted by the Tampa Bay Buccaneers in the seventh round (231st overall). He was waived on August 30, 2015, as part of Tampa Bay's final roster cutdowns.

New England Patriots
The New England Patriots signed Iosefa to their practice squad on October 21, 2015. On December 19, 2015, Iosefa was promoted to the Patriots' active roster. He made his NFL debut on December 20, 2015, in the Patriots' 33-16 win over the Tennessee Titans. He racked up 51 yards on 14 carries to lead the Patriots in rushing yards for the game.

On December 28, 2015, Iosefa was waived by the New England Patriots. On December 30, 2015, Iosefa was signed to the New England Patriots' practice squad. On January 26, 2016, Iosefa signed a futures contract with the New England Patriots.

Iosefa was released by the Patriots on May 6, 2016, but was re-signed on May 13.

On September 3, 2016, Iosefa was released by the Patriots as part of final roster cuts.

Rugby union
After his departure from the Patriots, Iosefa joined the Houston SaberCats for the 2018 season. He would play five matches with the SaberCats. He would later join the Seattle Saracens. Then on March 30, 2019, Iosefa was announced to join the Seattle Seawolves for their match on March 31.

References

1991 births
Living people
American sportspeople of Samoan descent
American football fullbacks
Hawaii Rainbow Warriors football players
Tampa Bay Buccaneers players
Players of American football from American Samoa
People from Pago Pago
Brooklyn Bolts players
New England Patriots players
Houston SaberCats players
Seattle Seawolves players
American rugby union players
Rugby union centres
American Samoan rugby union players